The following lists events that happened during 2011 in the Republic of Azerbaijan.

Incumbents
 President: Ilham Aliyev
 Prime Minister: Artur Rasizade 
 Speaker: Ogtay Asadov

Events

January 

 January - Memorandum of Understanding on a strategic energy partnership was signed between Azerbaijan and the EU.

February 

 February 14 - The new TV Channel Medeniyyet TV began to operate.

May 
 May 14 - Ell & Nikki win the Eurovision Song Contest with the song "Running Scared", Azerbaijan's first victory in the contest.

July 

 July 5–6 - III World Azerbaijanis Congress.

September 

 September 19 - Azerbaijan-Austrian business forum.

October 

 October 3 - Hilton Baku Hotel Complex was opened by the participation of Ilham Aliyev.
 October 25 - Azerbaijan became a non-permanent member of the UN Security Council for 2012-2013.

November 

 November 11 - The Azerbaijan-Hungary business forum.
 November 17 - The opening ceremony of Gabala International Airport.

December 

 December 8 - Foreign Relations Committee of Mexico adopted an agreement on the Nagorno Karabakh Conflict 
 December 24 - Groundbreaking ceremony of the Baku White City project.
 December 29 - The Intellectual Transportation Management Center was opened in Baku.
 December 30 -  "Koroglu" (formerly "Mashadi Azizbayov") station was opened.

References 

 
2010s in Azerbaijan
Azerbaijan
Azerbaijan
Azerbaijan